Bangassou is a city in the south eastern Central African Republic, lying on the north bank of the Mbomou River. It has a population of 24,447 (2003 census) and is the capital of the Mbomou prefecture. It is known for its wildlife, market, and nearby Bangassou Airport and is linked by ferry to the Democratic Republic of Congo on the south bank.  The city is also home to the Roman Catholic Diocese of Bangassou.

Axmin Mining Camp and Kembé Falls are located in the area.

History 

During the French colonial occupation of Congo Free State, the French military established a base at Bangassou. In 1922 the Spiritains established a Catholic mission in the town. In 1931 the société cotonnière Comouna built a cotton processing plant in the town. In 1935 the town became the capital of the Department of Mbomou.

Civil war 
On 11 March 2013 Seleka rebels occupied the town. On 10 October 2013 leader of Seleka fighters and 30 rebels who were occupying the town were arrested by authorities. In May 2017 Anti-balaka attacked and for a few days occupied the town resulting in more than 100 deaths. 

On January 3, 2021, rebel fighters backed by François Bozizé captured the town, according to MINUSCA. They withdrew from the town on 16 January and moved towards Niakari.

Climate 
Bangassou has a tropical savanna climate (Köppen climate classification Aw). Although the dry season from December to February is very short and more typical of tropical monsoon climates, the lengthy wet season from March to November is not sufficiently wet to so qualify.

Gallery

References 

 
Sub-prefectures of the Central African Republic
Central African Republic–Democratic Republic of the Congo border crossings
Populated places in Mbomou